Thailand competed at the 2019 World Aquatics Championships in Gwangju, South Korea from 12 to 28 July.

Artistic swimming

Thailand entered 12 artistic swimmers.

Women

 Legend: (R) = Reserve Athlete

Diving

Thailand entered six divers.

Men

Women

Mixed

Open water swimming

Thailand qualified two male and two female open water swimmers.

Men

Women

Swimming

Thailand entered six swimmers.

Men

Women

References

World Aquatics Championships
Nations at the 2019 World Aquatics Championships
2019